Sir John Edward Dorington, 1st Baronet,  (24 July 1832 – 5 April 1911) was a British Conservative politician.

The son of John E. Dorington of Lypiatt Park, Stroud he was educated at Windlesham House School, Eton College and Trinity College, Cambridge.

Dorington was returned to parliament for Stroud in a by-election in early January 1874. He lost his seat almost immediately in the general election commencing in late January 1874. However, the election was declared void in April 1874 and Dorington was once again returned in the following May by-election. He again lost his seat when this election was declared void in July 1874. He was created a baronet, of Lypiatt Park in the parish of Stroud in the county of Gloucester, in January 1886. In July of the same year he was once again returned to parliament, this time for Tewkesbury, and held the seat until his own death in 1911.

In December 1886 he was appointed a Deputy Lieutenant of Gloucestershire. He was appointed a Privy Councillor on 11 August 1902, following an announcement of the King's intention to make this appointment in the 1902 Coronation Honours list published in June that year.

He continued to represent Tewkesbury in parliament until 1906. His death in April 1911, aged 78. The baronetcy died with him.

References

External links

1832 births
1911 deaths
Conservative Party (UK) MPs for English constituencies
Baronets in the Baronetage of the United Kingdom
Deputy Lieutenants of Gloucestershire
Members of the Privy Council of the United Kingdom
People educated at Windlesham House School